As seen on TV is a marketing phrase used to represent products advertised on television.

As seen on TV may also refer to:

 As Seen on TV (TV series), a 2009 British panel game show
 "As Seen on TV" (SpongeBob SquarePants), an episode in season 3 of SpongeBob SquarePants 
 As Seen on TV, an EP by Primer 55, reissued as Introduction to Mayhem

See also 
 As Seen on Television, a 2004 EP by +/-
 Ass Seen on TV, a 1997 split album by Gob and Another Joe
 Victoria Wood: As Seen on TV, a 1985-1987 British comedy television series